The Buffalo-Glencoe Tondas are a defunct Tier II Junior "A" ice hockey team that played in Buffalo, New York and later in Glencoe, Ontario, Canada.  They played in the Southern Ontario Junior A Hockey League.

History
The Tondas joined the Southern Ontario Junior A Hockey League in 1973.  Their performance was not spectacular and they did not draw well.  Late in the year, the team was moved to Glencoe, Ontario which was a lot closer to the rest of the teams.  They were renamed the Buffalo-Glencoe Tondas.

With only fifteen wins in sixty-two games during the 1973-74 season, the Tondas were not a successful franchise and did not return in 1974-75.

Season-by-season record

Playoffs
1974 DNQ

External links
OHA Website

Sports in Buffalo, New York
Defunct ice hockey teams in the United States
Defunct ice hockey teams in Canada
Ice hockey teams in Ontario
Ice hockey teams in New York (state)